Juan Bautista Torales, nicknamed Téju (born 9 March 1956 in Luque) is a retired football defender from Paraguay. He was capped 77 times, and scored 1 goal for the Paraguay national football team in an international career that lasted from 1979 to 1989. He played for the Paraguay squad that won the 1979 Copa América. He is the main co-commentator of matches of the Paraguay national football team with Hugo Miño in Play-by-Play on Tigo Sports, Tigo Sports 2 or Tigo Sports 3.

Career
Torales made his professional debut for Sportivo Luqueño in 1976. He joined Libertad in 1981 and played for the club until 1991. He spent the 1992 season with Club Guaraní before returning to Sportivo Luqueño, where he played until his retirement from football in 1995 at the age of 39.

References

External links
 International statistics at rsssf
 Albiroja profile

1957 births
Living people
Sportspeople from Luque
Paraguayan footballers
Paraguay international footballers
Sportivo Luqueño players
Club Libertad footballers
Club Guaraní players
Copa América-winning players
1986 FIFA World Cup players
1979 Copa América players
1987 Copa América players
1989 Copa América players
Association football defenders